The women's C1–3 individual pursuit event in cycling at the 2012 Summer Olympics was held on 30 August at the London Velopark. Ten riders from eight nations competed.

The competition began with five head to head races between the ten riders. These races were held over a 3000 m course and each rider was given a time for their race. The fastest two riders were advanced to the gold medal final whilst the third and fourth fastest times raced it out for the bronze.

The gold medal was eventually won by Zeng Sini of China, while Simone Kennedy of Australia took the silver and Allison Jones of the United States took bronze.

Qualification

Bronze medal race

Gold medal race

References
Official London 2012 Summer Paralympics Results 

Women's pursuit C1-3
2012 in women's road cycling